Part of Me or A Part of Me may refer to:

Songs 
"Part of Me" (Chris Cornell song), 2008
"Part of Me" (Katy Perry song), 2012
"Part of Me" (Stellar song), 1999
"Part of Me", by Ayumi Hamasaki from A Best 2, 2007
"A Part of Me", by Device from the deluxe edition of Device, 2013
"Part of Me", by Hybrid Theory from Hybrid Theory EP, 1999
"Part of Me", by Royce da 5'9" from Street Hop, 2008
"Part of Me", by Tool from Opiate, 1992

Other uses 
Katy Perry: Part of Me, a 2012 film
Part of Me (TV series), English name of En otra piel, a 2014 telenovela

See also 
"Biggest Part of Me", a song by Ambrosia from One Eighty, 1980

de:Part of Me